Manjaros is a restaurant chain franchise based in the north of England, United Kingdom. Restaurants serve African, Caribbean, Italian, and local cuisine .

History

The first Manjaros was opened in Middlesbrough in 2013.
By January 2018 further branches had opened in Leeds, Manchester and Birmingham. March came a Newcastle branch with Bradford, Glasgow, Huddersfield and Preston by also added by end of that year.

The 10th restaurant opened in Ilford in February 2019.

During the English coronavirus lockdown in 2020 Manjaro’s Darlington restaurant opened with a delivery service until lockdown eased when it could open its table service. Post lockdown it took over a bistro, as a third addition to its Tees Valley restaurants and twelfth overall, in Ingleby Barwick.

Cuisine
The chain specialises in African–Caribbean fusion cuisine; its website indicates that its food is halal.

Having originated on Teesside the chain has gained a significant reputation for its parmo, a local dish.  Most restaurants also feature a gelato lounge.

Incidents
 On 24 December 2017 a supplier was stabbed and killed in the kitchen of the Middlesbrough restaurant by a member of staff.  In court it was determined that the deceased had previously reacted violently when his produce was refused on quality grounds; the staff member was acquitted of the charges of murder, manslaughter and two knife offences.
 A mouse was released in the Middlesbrough restaurant, which was voluntarily closed until Food Standard Agency inspectors confirmed there were no issues.

References

Restaurant groups in the United Kingdom